Evergestis pallidata is a species of moth of the family Crambidae described by Johann Siegfried Hufnagel in 1811. It is found in Europe, across the Palearctic and in North America.

The wingspan is 24–29 mm. The ground colour of the front wings is a shiny yellow with brown-red transverse lines, stigmata and veins that create a mesh pattern. The hind wings are dazzlingly white with some incomplete brown lines. The moth flies from June to September depending on the location.

The larvae feed on Brassicaceae species, especially Barbarea vulgaris.

References

External links
 Waarneming.nl 
 Lepidoptera of Belgium 
 Evergestis pallidata at UKMoths

Evergestis
Moths of Europe
Moths of Asia
Moths of North America
Moths described in 1811